Haruka Agatsuma (我妻 悠香, Agatsuma Haruka, born 18 December 1994) is a Japanese softball player. She competed in the 2020 Summer Olympics and won a gold medal.

References

1994 births
Living people
Asian Games medalists in softball
Asian Games gold medalists for Japan
Japanese softball players
Medalists at the 2018 Asian Games
Medalists at the 2020 Summer Olympics
Olympic medalists in softball
Olympic softball players of Japan
Olympic gold medalists for Japan
Softball players at the 2018 Asian Games
Softball players at the 2020 Summer Olympics
Competitors at the 2022 World Games
World Games silver medalists
World Games medalists in softball
21st-century Japanese women